Carlshöjd is a residential area in Umeå, Sweden.

History
The names Carlshöjd, Carlslid and Carlshem originate from the inn Carlslund, which at the end of the 18th century was located where Älvans väg in Tomtebo exists today.

External links
Carlshöjd at Umeå Municipality

Umeå